Shri Vasantrao Naik Government Medical College, (SVNGMC) is a Government Medical college & Hospital in Yavatmal city, in the Vidarbha region of the Maharashtra, India; that provides medical education at undergraduate and postgraduate levels. SVNGMC is named after the former Chief Minister of Maharashtra, late Shri Vasantrao Naik.

Established in 1989, recognized by Medical Council of India, SVNGMC is run by the State Government of Maharashtra, India. It is regulated by the Directorate of Medical Education and Research (DMER), Mumbai and by Maharashtra University of Health Sciences (MUHS), Nashik. The MUHS Nashik college code for SVNGMC Yavatmal is 1507.

Academics
Courses available in SVNGMC 
 MBBS 
 MD/MS
 CPS Diploma

Admissions

Undergraduate
Every year a batch of 150 students ( now 200) is enrolled for MBBS degree course. Each medical student is uniquely identified with the year and a roll number in the batch. For example, "SVNGMC-2005-99" indicates a student belonging to the 2005 batch with a roll number of 99. 
After successful completion of the course, which consist of 54 months of active learning and 12 months of training (internship), medical students are awarded MBBS degree.

Students are admitted on the basis of common merit list based on the marks obtained in NEET

Postgraduate
SVNGMC has PG courses in various subjects. PG seats are filled through NEET-PG

Departments

Pre-clinical

 Department of Anatomy 
 Department of Physiology
 Department of Biochemistry

Para-clinical

 Department of Pathology
 Department of Pharmacology
 Department of Microbiology
 Department of Forensic Medicine & Toxicology
 Department of Preventive & Social Medicine
 Department of Radiology

Clinical

 Department of Medicine
 Department of General Surgery
 Department of Orthopedics 
 Department of Pediatrics
 Department of Obstetrics & Gynecology 
 Department of Anaesthesia
 Department of Chest & TB
 Department of Skin & VD
 Department of Ophthalmology
 Department of ENT
 Department of Psychiatry

Infrastructure Overview

Land area: 5,13,969 square meters
Out Patient Department (OPD) Complex
288 bedded New Hospital Building with 12 well-equipped operation theaters
252 bedded Old Civil Hospital Building
Old Women’s Hospital and T.B. Hospital attached to the institution
Auditorium with 800 seats and balcony, with advanced sound system
Library with Internet facility
Dharmshala (a free lodging facility for relatives of patients)
CT scan, ICCU, Blood Bank, ART (Anti Retroviral Treatment) facilities are available
Hostels for medical students and resident doctors

Social Responsibilities
SVNGMC is helping local communities in their medical emergencies as well as supporting local projects and working with local NGO's. SVNGMC is also getting involved in national calamities and supporting communities who suffered from the shock. In the year 2014 India–Pakistan floods, team of doctors went to Kashmir after accepted request sent by Adhik Kadam of Borderless World Foundation who work in Kashmir Valley since 1997. Our two teams work for 40 days and served more than 30,000 patients through organized medical camps by the Kashmir Life Line, which is mainly working in Medical Emergency Services.

References

External links
Official Website of SVNGMC, Yavatmal
College Information in AVICENNA Directories
College Information in FAIMER Database
 Medical Council of India
 Directorate of Medical Education and Research, Mumbai
 Maharashtra University of Health Sciences, Nashik
 National Eligibility cum Entrance Test - Post Graduate
 College of Physicians & Surgeons of Mumbai

Medical Council of India
Medical colleges in Maharashtra
Yavatmal
Educational institutions established in 1989
1989 establishments in Maharashtra
Affiliates of Maharashtra University of Health Sciences